Fionán Mackessy (born 1998) is an Irish hurler who plays for Kerry Senior Championship club St Brendan's and at inter-county level with the Kerry senior hurling team. He usually lines out as a centre-back.

Career

Mackessy first came to prominence as a dual player, primarily with St Brendan's Hurling Club but also as a Gaelic footballer with the Ardfert club. He has enjoyed championship success in the minor and under-21 grades and was at centre-back when St Brendan's were beaten by Kilmoyley in the 2021 Kerry SHC final. Mackessy first appeared on the inter-county scene as a dual player at minor level with the respective Kerry minor teams. After winning consecutive All-Ireland MBHC titles, including one as team captain, he was a member of the extended training panel when the Kerry minor football team beat Galway in the 2016 All-Ireland minor final. Mackessy subsequently lined out for the under-21 team before making his Kerry senior hurling team debut in 2019. He has also won a Ryan Cup with MTU Kerry.

Career statistics

Honours

MTU Kerry
 Ryan Cup: 2022 (c)

Kerry

Football
 All-Ireland Minor Football Championship: 2016
 Munster Minor Football Championship: 2016

Hurling
 All-Ireland Minor B Hurling Championship: 2014 (c), 2015
 All-Ireland Under-21 B Hurling Championship: 2018

Individual
 Higher Education GAA Rising Stars Football Team (1): 2022
 Higher Education GAA Rising Stars Hurling Team (1): 2022

References

1998 births
Living people
St Brendan's hurlers
Ardfert Gaelic footballers
Kerry inter-county hurlers